Legana is a rural and residential locality in the local government area (LGA) of West Tamar in the Launceston LGA region of Tasmania. The 2016 census has a population of 4029 for the state suburb of Legana.
It is 12 kilometres north of Tasmania's second largest city, Launceston. It is adjacent to Riverside, Bridgenorth, Grindelwald and Rosevears.

The name "Legana" is based on the Palawa word for "fresh water" since it is at the point where the Tamar River becomes fresh water. There is currently a homestead called "Freshwater" which was adjacent to a private jetty where early settlers traded with the local natives. This homestead, in Nobelius Drive, now operates as a Bed and Breakfast accommodation house.

Legana is also the name of a comparatively little-known and rare apple variety bred at Legana. Leganas are a cross between Tasma and Delicious. They are bright red apples, with a shape similar to Delicious with a smooth crown and the colour of a Tasma. Leganas have been described as a very good eating apple, sweet and nutty with dense, crisp, juicy white to yellow flesh.

History
After European settlement, Legana was initially a rural town made up of dairy farms, apple orchards, and cattle grazing. Most of the residences were originally located near the Tamar River with housing developments built nearer to the West Tamar Highway. Legana was also originally called Legana Estate.
Legana was gazetted as a locality in 1963.

Legana Post Office opened on 1 April 1910.

Geography
The waters of the Tamar River estuary form the north-eastern, eastern and south-eastern boundaries.

Road infrastructure
The West Tamar Highway (Route A7) passes through from south-east to north-west. Route C732 (Bridgenorth Road) starts at an intersection with A7 and runs west until it exits. Route C733 (Rosevears Drive) starts at an intersection with A7 and runs north until it exits.

Community
Like most smaller rural townships, sporting clubs play an important part of the social life of Legana. Most of the community facilities are located within a community precinct which accommodates the Legana Cricket Club who compete in the TCL cricket competition running two teams, and although a struggle they try hard, the Legana Tennis Club, and children's community playground. Near the playground the council is planning to build a bicycle dirt jump park for the local youths to ride their bikes. The memorial hall is near to this precinct.
Legana has a Youth Group run by the West Tamar Council which is held at the memorial hall, allowing the youths to join in afterschool activities and games.

A shopping centre has been built on the other side of this community precinct which provides the community with a supermarket and number of speciality shops. The shopping centre has had an upgrade and has been extended from the side and the back. Recently the area has had more developments in that businesses have decided to take advantage of this growing community: Legana now has a post office and a newsagent with Tatts Lotto, chemist, butcher, baker, hairdresser, KFC, Legana Tavern, BWS Bottle Shop, Legana Medical Centre, Launceston Holiday Park Caravan Park, Lawson Homes, Legana Bakery, Legana Plants Plus Nursery, Legana Hair & Beauty Salon, Liberty service station (formerly BP Legana), florist, R&R Caravan Centre, Reject Shop, Scotts Motorcycle Spares, Newman Automotive, Velo wines, Impact kitchens, Salvation Army, St John's Foot Clinic, Tyres and More, Eyelines Glasses & Frames & Repairs, Harcourt's Real Estate, Woolworths, Woolworth's Petrol Plus, 2 ATMs at Woolworths, as well as other new shops.

Legana Fire Brigade consists of a group of enthusiastic volunteers who provide the community with a fire protection service equipped to respond to both structure and vegetation fires, car accidents, and fire alarms. Legana Fire Brigade was formed soon after the devastating 1967 bushfires in Tasmania.
Legana Fire Brigade's first piece of equipment was a tanker trailer, purchased by the then Beaconsfield Council under a Rural Fires Board subsidy scheme, and housed at the Brigade Captain's property.
At about this time the Legana area began to change from one of apple and pear orchards and dairy farming to a rural residential nature with a sub-division at Freshwater Point.
As a result, the Council provided a four-wheel drive medium tanker which again was housed at the Brigade Captain's.
As Legana's population grew the existing members felt that the Fire Commission should provide a more suitable shed which was built in the early 80s.
The members went further however and after much hard work, fund-raising and lobbying they were able to ensure that a meeting room and office were incorporated into the new station that was finally opened in 1985. The station was located on the old Freshwater Point Road but the developments of Grindelwald, Rosevears, Danbury Park and the general expansion of Legana itself led to plans being discussed in 1996 for a larger replacement station in a more central location.

Churches in Legana include the Legana Christian Church, a for profit business in Gerrard Close, and the Free Reformed Church in Outreach Drive.

The vineyard at Velo wines on the West Tamar Highway was first planted with Cabernet Sauvignon in 1966 and through its former owner Graham Wiltshire played an important role in the development of the Tasmanian wine industry. The history of the industry is documented in a 2012 thesis by Anthony Walker. Walker's thesis can be accessed through the University of Tasmania's website www.eprints.utas.edu.au.

The Tasmanian Government is building a primary school at Legana, providing state-of-the-art learning spaces for 350 students and has partnered with the West Tamar Council to include a new community sports precinct around the school to enhance school and community facilities. The new primary school will be co-located with the new community sports precinct at 612 West Tamar Highway Legana through a joint acquisition of 7.2 hectares of land by the Department of Education and the West Tamar Council.

Bus services
All passenger and school bus services to and from Legana are run by Manions' Buses. The "Legana Loop" route travels to and from Launceston.

Local government
Legana is a part of the West Tamar Municipality.

Notes and references

Towns in Tasmania
Localities of West Tamar Council